Air Marshal Sir John Frederick Andrews Higgins,  (1 September 1875 – 1 June 1948), known as Jack Higgins, was a senior officer in the Royal Flying Corps, serving as a brigade commander from 1915 to 1918. After the First World War he served in a range of senior posts in the Royal Air Force until his retirement in 1930. He returned to active service for the first year of the Second World War.

RAF career
Higgins became a cadet at the Royal Military Academy, Woolwich and was commissioned into the Royal Field Artillery as a second lieutenant on 15 June 1895, and promoted to lieutenant on 15 June 1898. He served in the Second Boer War in South Africa, where he took part in the operations in Natal in 1899, including actions at Rietfontein and Lombard's Kop. Severely wounded in early January 1900, during the Defence of Ladysmith, he was later back in action and was promoted to captain on 15 March 1901. After the end of the war in June 1902, Higgins left Cape Town in the SS Bavarian in August, returning to Southampton the following month. For his service during the war, he was mentioned in despatches and awarded the Distinguished Service Order (DSO) dated 29 November 1900.

After his return, he was posted at Ammunition Park, Aldershot Garrison. He served as Officer Commanding No. 5 Squadron from July 1913 and then at the start of November 1914, Higgins was selected to head up the RFC's training wing which was based at Netheravon. He went on to command II Brigade RFC, VI Brigade RFC and then III Brigade RFC during the course of the First World War. In the closing stages of the war he was General Officer Commanding No. 3 Area and then General Officer Commanding Midland Area.

After the War he was appointed General Officer Commanding RAF forces of the Rhine and then Air Officer Commanding Northern Area before becoming Director of Personnel at the Air Ministry in 1920. He went on to be Air Officer Commanding Inland Area in 1922, Air Officer Commanding Iraq Command in 1924 and Air Member for Supply and Research in 1926. He retired to India in 1930 but was recalled as Air Officer Commanding-in-Chief of the Air Forces in India in October 1939 at the start of the Second World War before retiring again in August 1940.

References

|-

|-

|-

|-

|-

|-

|-

|-

|-

|-

1875 births
1948 deaths
British Army personnel of the Second Boer War
Graduates of the Royal Military Academy, Woolwich
Royal Flying Corps officers
Royal Air Force generals of World War I
Royal Air Force air marshals of World War II
Knights Commander of the Order of the Bath
Knights Commander of the Order of the British Empire
Companions of the Distinguished Service Order
Recipients of the Air Force Cross (United Kingdom)